Budgie the Little Helicopter is a British animated television series, relating to a fictional helicopter and his friends, based on a series of children's books. The characters were based on the books by Sarah Ferguson, Duchess of York. The show was coproduced by Fred Wolf Films Dublin, The Sleepy Kids Company and Sarah Ferguson, Duchess of York for HTV West and Scottish Television Enterprises, and originally aired on British television in 1994 on CITV, where it ran for 39 episodes. A range of videos, books, and toys were released under the Budgie label.

The show aired in the United States on FOX as part of the Fox Cubhouse programming block from 1995 to 1996, and moved to the Fox Family Channel in 1998 as part of It's Itsy Bitsy Time. The series was redubbed with North American voices for It’s Itsy Bitsy Time. In Canada, it also aired on Family Channel from 1994-97 and on Treehouse TV from 1999-2003.

On release of the very first book, Sarah was accused by the media of copying the idea for the series from an out-of-print 1960 book Hector the Helicopter, by A.W. Baldwin, which she denied.

The series is legally available on Ferguson's official YouTube channel.

Characters

Aircraft

Main
 Budgie the Little Helicopter (voiced by Richard Pearce) is the title character who resembles a Bell 206) with a big yellow cap covering his entire airframe and a small tuft of brown hair underneath it, and also speaks in Teenage accent. He lives and works at Harefield Airfield, and he and Pippa are best friends. He can be cheeky and troublesome at times, but he works hard too, and continuously tries to please Lionel, the Aircraft in charge. He will also bravely come to the assistance of people in danger. He hates going through the heli-wash, and avoids doing so when he can. He also has a Phobia about Missiles. A white teddy bear named Snowy is nearly always seen carried in a deep pocket on Budgie's starboard. His catchphrase is "Rocketing Rotors!"
 Pippa the Single-Engined Mono-Plane (voiced by Abigail MacVean) is Budgie's friend who has a tuft of blonde hair and a big pink white-spotted bow on her roof, as well as a red mouth below her black nose. Pippa was the second aircraft to arrive at Harefield Airfield, and at first, she teased Budgie and called him a yo-yo and then a snail. After a race and several comparisons about who was the best of the best, they both became firm friends. Pippa enjoys helping out, and likes using the heli-wash (as opposed to Budgie).
 Chuck the American Helicopter (voiced by Kerry Shale) (was stated in the second TV episode as being a Boeing CH-47 Chinook) is a twin-rotored helicopter, with what appears to be a crew cut under his cap. He does not understand British English well at all. He sometimes gets cocky and likes to show off, but this led him to trouble when he disrupted an air show and finished up in a pond. He also has a bad habit of frequently calling Lionel "Captain".
 Lionel the Aircraft in Charge (voiced by Jeremy Nicholas) is the senior helicopter in the series (influenced by a Westland Lynx), sporting a modern-era pilot's cap, moustache and a collar (with his front landing gear resembling a tie). He does not take kindly to Budgie, Pippa, or especially Chuck causing trouble and making themselves nuisances, but he always keeps things in order with his patient but firm ways. He insists on cleanliness from the aircraft at all times, and is nicer than what he appears to be. His catchphrase is "Juddering joysticks!"

Other aircraft
 Patsy the American stunt plane (was stated by Lionel as being a Pitt's Special).
 Wally the old Supermarine Walrus
 Jean Claude the pompous French Concorde
 Jasper Jeer-jet the snobbish private jet. Jasper was a joker to start off and kept on radioing Harefield Airfield pretending there was an emergency, but when he really did need help in a storm, Budgie came to his rescue, and since then Jasper has realised it is not a good idea to play the fool all the time.
 Henry the three-winged propeller-driven 1930s airliner
 Olivia The Edgley Optica (only in Put Up or Stuck Up)
 Dougie The Police Helicopter (only in Eye in The Sky)
 The Emerald Helicopter (only in Eye in The Sky)
 Unnamed Boeing 747 jet plane (only in Double Trouble)
 A Very Naughtiest Version of Budgie
 The naughty Piper plane, Pippa's "double" (only in Double Trouble)
 Aircraft Carrier Helicopter
 Gloria The Glider
 Mini Planes (only appeared in Deep Sleep)
 Three other gliders
 Gus the Guppy (based on an Aero Spacelines Super Guppy), is a huge American transport aircraft.
 Harvey the grey Royal Navy BAE Sea Harrier jet fighter. Harvey appeared in All at Sea and Boats, Boots and Budgie. His name was revealed in Blown Up Let down. He speaks with a traditional Royal Navy pilot voice.
 Harvey's 2 BAE Sea Harrier brothers
 Buddy the Sikorsky Skycrane, Chuck's old friend from the air force
 3 French Super Jets (from Budgie Barges In)
 Genevieve – a French female Jodel D11 aircraft (The Air Show and Budgie Barges In)
 White jet plane with blue line (only appeared in magazines)
 Other planes and helicopters (only appeared in books)
 Monsieur the Mime Helicopter (only appeared in books)
 Bobby the Blue Helicopter (only appeared in books)
 Western the Mexican Plane (only appeared in books)
 Unnamed blue helicopter (only appeared in magazines)
 Hot air balloons (only appeared in The Balloon Goes Up)
 Spaceship (only appeared in magazines)

Non-aircraft/ground characters
 Dell the yellow Baggage cart Towing Truck (voiced by Jeff Rawle, who also serves as the narrator)
 Smokey the airfield fire engine
 Don the blue stairs lorry
 Ernest the tractor (In episode Silent Flight Gloria called him "Mr. Smelly Exhaust" when he was launching gliders using his winch.)
 Julie the posh purple vintage car
 Nosey the driller (spoofed on The Three Stooges)
 Backhoe the Backhoe loader (spoofed on The Three Stooges)
 Smashit the Bulldozer who gets Budgie in Trouble
 Sonia the Limousine
 Jake the Steam locomotive
 Fred the Canal Barge
 Harry the Inflatable Boat (only appeared in Blown Up Let Down)
 Gimbus The Cement Mixer (only appeared in Budgie Sticks To It)
 Cubey the Stuck Up ROV Submarine (only appeared in the Ups & Downs)
 Sharkey the Aircraft Carrier (only appeared in the book Budgie Goes To The Sea)
 Unnamed Blue Car (only appeared in Boom Boom Budgie'')
 Pirate Ship (only appeared in magazines)
 Tugboat (only appeared in magazines)
 Aircraft Carriers (only appeared in books)

Human characters
 Mrs. Nancy Kitchen, the twins' mother
 Ben Kitchen, Lucy's brother
 Lucy Kitchen, Ben's sister
 Catherine, the twins' aunt
 Mike Sprocket the mechanic, always making mistakes, to the disapproval of Ken. His catchphrase is, "Aw, man!"
 Ken Wrench the mechanic
 The control tower operator
 Jim, one of Budgie's Aircraft pilots
 Arnold, one of Budgie's Aircraft pilots
 other Pilots and Drivers to all Others

Animal characters
 Snowy the Teddy Bear
 The Rabbit
 Fergus the cat
 Oliver the hangar owl
 The Hangar mouse

Voice Cast (UK only)
Richard Pearce as Budgie the Little Helicopter (lead of the series), Jim and Arnold
Abigail MacVean as Pippa the Single-Engined Mono-Plane
Jeremy Nicholas as Lionel the Aircraft In Charge
Kerry Shale as Chuck the American Helicopter
Jeff Rawle as Narrator and Dell the Baggage Truck
Ray Lonnen as Smokey the Fire Engine
Tony Jackson as Ken, Ernest the Tractor, and Don the Stairs Lorry
Melvyn Hayes as Nosey the Driller
William Vanderpuye as Mike
Pippa Haywood
Peter Lloyd
Ania Sowinski
Zoe Hodges as Lucy Kitchen
Adrian Hansel as Ben Kitchen
Judy Bennett
Jill Lidstone
Gary Martin as Smashit the Bulldozer
Eve Karpf as Olivia The Edgley Optica
Susan Sheridan as Sonia the limousine (Episode: "Down on the Farm")

Home media

UK VHS

US VHS

Episodes

Season 1 (1994)

Season 2 (1995)

Season 3 (1996)

Home video releases
In 1997, UAV Entertainment released some episodes of the series on individual VHS tapes and the complete series tapes were also released. Two DVDs were released in the UK in 2004 and 2006 with selected episodes. In 2007, Jigsaw Entertainment released the complete series on DVD in Australia and New Zealand.

References

External links
Toonhound

First episode at YouTube
Image of front cover of the original book

1990s British animated television series
1990s British children's television series
1994 British television series debuts
1996 British television series endings
British children's animated adventure television series
British children's animated fantasy television series
British television shows based on children's books
English-language television shows
Aviation television series
Animated television series about children
ITV children's television shows
Television shows produced by Harlech Television (HTV)
Television shows produced by Scottish Television
Television series by ITV Studios